Ludwig Czech (14 February 1870 – 20 August 1942) was a German-speaking Jewish Czech member of the German Social Democratic Workers' Party in the Czechoslovak Republic who actively participated in the Czechoslovak politics of the so-called First Republic. He was a Minister of Social Care (1929–1934). Minister of Public Affairs (1934–1935), Minister of Public Health and Physical Training (1935–1938). He died in the Theresienstadt Ghetto in 1942, officially having died of pneumonia, heart failure, and edema of the lungs.

References

1870 births
1942 deaths
Politicians from Lviv
People from the Kingdom of Galicia and Lodomeria
Ukrainian Jews
Jews from Galicia (Eastern Europe)
Czech people of Ukrainian-Jewish descent
German Social Democratic Workers' Party in the Czechoslovak Republic politicians
Government ministers of Czechoslovakia
Members of the Chamber of Deputies of Czechoslovakia (1920–1925)
Members of the Chamber of Deputies of Czechoslovakia (1925–1929)
Members of the Chamber of Deputies of Czechoslovakia (1929–1935)
Members of the Chamber of Deputies of Czechoslovakia (1935–1939)
Members of the Executive of the Labour and Socialist International
Jewish socialists
Czech people who died in the Theresienstadt Ghetto
Recipients of the Order of Tomáš Garrigue Masaryk
Deaths from pneumonia in Czechoslovakia
Deaths from pulmonary edema